Huka is a genus of South Pacific funnel weavers first described by Raymond Robert Forster & C. L. Wilton in 1973.

Species
 it contains five species, all found in New Zealand:
Huka alba Forster & Wilton, 1973 — New Zealand
Huka lobata Forster & Wilton, 1973 — New Zealand
Huka minima Forster & Wilton, 1973 — New Zealand
Huka minuta Forster & Wilton, 1973 — New Zealand
Huka pallida Forster & Wilton, 1973 — New Zealand

References

Agelenidae
Araneomorphae genera
Taxa named by Raymond Robert Forster